Čurović is a Serbian surname. Notable people with the surname include:

Darren Curovic (born 1966), Australian kickboxing fight promoter
Dejan Čurović (born 1968), former Serbian footballer
Petar Čurović (born 1984), Montenegrin volleyball player
Tamara Čurović (born 1994), Serbian tennis player

Montenegrin surnames
Serbian surnames
Patronymic surnames